Andreas Matthias Donner (15 June 1918 in Rotterdam – 24 August 1992 in Amersfoort) was a Dutch judge and the second President of the European Court of Justice, a position which he served between 1958 and 1964.

Early life 
Donner stems from a prominent Dutch Reformed family of jurists. His father Jan Donner and his son Piet Hein Donner were Dutch Minister of Justice, with his son also being the current Dutch Vice President of the Council of State. André Donner's brother Jan Hein Donner was a chess grandmaster.

Donner studied law at the Vrije Universiteit Amsterdam, where he graduated at the age of 21 years old. He obtained his doctorate at the same university with a thesis named "De rechtskracht van administratieve beschikkingen".

In 1955 he became member of the Royal Netherlands Academy of Arts and Sciences, four years later he became foreign member.

The Van Gend en Loos v Nederlandse Administratie der Belastingen case was issued during his term as President of the European Court of Justice.

See also

List of members of the European Court of Justice

References

External links
Biography

1918 births
1992 deaths
20th-century Dutch judges
Members of the Royal Netherlands Academy of Arts and Sciences
Presidents of the European Court of Justice
Lawyers from Rotterdam
Vrije Universiteit Amsterdam alumni
Academic staff of Vrije Universiteit Amsterdam
Academic staff of the University of Groningen
Dutch judges of international courts and tribunals